Reidar Goa (8 April 1942 – 8 September 2018) was a Norwegian football player.

He first played for Randaberg IL. He then played for Viking FK (from 1966 to 1977), with 404 matches for the first team. He played four matches for the Norway national football team, between 1970 and 1975. With Viking he won the Norwegian football league four times, in 1972, 1973, 1974, and 1975.

References

External links 
 

1942 births
2018 deaths
Sportspeople from Rogaland
Norwegian footballers
Randaberg IL players
Viking FK players
Norway international footballers
Association football defenders